Christopher Palmer (born 16 October 1983) is an English professional footballer who made more than 200 appearances in the Football League. He most recently played for Conference Premier side Tamworth, where he played as a midfielder.

Playing career
Palmer was born in Derby and attended Derby Moor Community School. He began his professional career with Derby County, but did not establish himself as a first-team member. He then joined Notts County in 2004, from where he went out to Hereford United on loan for a month, making three appearances. He was given a first-team place on his return, making 24 appearances and scoring four goals.

Palmer signed for Wycombe Wanderers in the summer of 2006. He initially held down a place in the first team, but struggled to win back his place after a shoulder injury. He went on loan to Darlington in August 2007. After being released by Wycombe he signed for Walsall on 1 August 2008, after a successful trial period with the club.

On 6 July 2009, Palmer joined Football League One side Gillingham. On 17 June 2011, Palmer moved to Football League Two side Burton Albion.

Following his release from Burton Albion, Palmer joined Waitakere United in New Zealand on a short-term contract. He scored three goals for Waitakere in the group stages of the 2012–13 OFC Champions League and played in the final, which they lost 2–1 to Auckland City. He later returned to England to play for Northern Premier League Premier Division side Ilkeston on non-contract terms on 16 August 2013, where he was joined by his former Burton Albion colleague Aaron Webster. He made nine appearances for the Robins in all competitions, scoring once.

On 3 October 2013, Palmer left Ilkeston and signed for Conference North side Oxford City. On 29 January 2014, Palmer signed for Conference Premier side Tamworth, but after five appearances Palmer was released by the club on 27 February 2014.

References

External links

1983 births
Living people
English footballers
Footballers from Derby
Association football midfielders
Derby County F.C. players
Hereford United F.C. players
Notts County F.C. players
Wycombe Wanderers F.C. players
Darlington F.C. players
Walsall F.C. players
Gillingham F.C. players
Burton Albion F.C. players
Waitakere United players
Ilkeston F.C. players
Oxford City F.C. players
Rainworth Miners Welfare F.C. players
Mickleover Sports F.C. players
Tamworth F.C. players
English Football League players
National League (English football) players
Northern Premier League players